The 1933 Tour de France was the 27th edition of the Tour de France, taking place from 27 June to 23 July.

This race featured the introduction of the mountains competition, in which cyclists were challenged to climb the mountains the fastest, with points given to the fastest ascenders. This competition was won by Spaniard Vicente Trueba, who reached 9 of the 16 mountain peaks first.

The time bonus of two minutes had a large influence on the outcome of the race. Thanks to this bonus, Georges Speicher won the race; without the bonus, Italian Giuseppe Martano would have been the winner.

Innovations and changes
In the 1932 Tour de France, the bonus system had had a major impact on the results: without these bonuses, the difference between the number one and number two would have been only three seconds, but with these bonuses, it became more than 24 minutes.
In 1933, the bonus time was reduced: only the winner received two minutes of bonus time.

Since the 1913 Tour de France, the Tour de France had been counter-clockwise. In 1933, this changed, and the race was run clockwise again.

Teams

Belgium, Italy, Switzerland, Germany and France entered national teams, consisting of eight cyclists. Additionally, 40 touriste-routiers, cyclists without a team, entered the race.

Pre-race favourites
The French team has been named the best collection of pre-war cyclists. The Belgian team had talented riders, but were split between French-speaking and Dutch-speaking cyclists.
The Italian team was headed by Learco Guerra. Guerra had won three stages in the 1933 Giro d'Italia and had been world champion. Tour director Henri Desgrange had named Guerra as probable winner of the race.

Race overview

On 27 June 1933, the Tour de France was started by Josephine Baker.
The French team, that had won the last three Tours de France, started well. Maurice Archambaud won the first stage, and lead the general classification until the Alps.
In the third stage, French sprinter Charles Pélissier, who had already won 13 Tour stages in his career, hit a car. He continued the race, but was injured, and finished behind the time limit.

Until the eighth stage, the battle for the lead was between Archambaud and Learco Guerra. In that eighth stage, French cyclist Georges Speicher asked permission to his team leader Archambaud if he could go for the stage win, and he could. He raced away, and won the stage.

In the mountains of the ninth stage, Archambaud could not compete with the rest. When Archambaud folded on the Allos, somebody else could take over the lead. The next cyclist in the General Classification, Guerra, had a flat tire, and could not win enough time. In the end, it was unknown Belgian Georges Lemaire who took over the lead. Guerra was only 23 seconds behind in the General Classification after that stage.

In stage 10, all but six cyclists finished more than 22 minutes after the winner. According to the rules, the cut-off time (the extra time that a cyclist can lose on the stage winner before he is taken out of the race) was 8% of the time of the stage winner. That rule would have put everybody but these six cyclists out of the race. Because of this, the Tour director Henri Desgrange extended the cut-off time for this stage to 10%, in this way 43 cyclists stayed in the race.

In the eleventh stage, the cut-off time was 10%. This would take four cyclists out of the race, but for them the cut-off time was increased to 15%. One of these cyclists had been hit by a car from the Tour direction. Maurice Archambaud took back the lead after that stage thanks to the bonus time, but not for long, as he lost time in the next stage.

Georges Speicher led the race from stage 12 on. In the mountains, Speicher struggled. He was dropped many times on the climbs, but was a good descender and got back to the lead group every time. Lemaire initially stayed close to Speicher, and was only 15 seconds behind in the general classification. l'Equipe wrote that with the help of his Belgian team, Lemaire could have challenged Speicher for the overall victory, especially thanks to the help of Jean Aerts. But the Belgian team was still divided between the Dutch-speaking and French-speaking cyclists, and Jean Aerts did not help Lemaire but went for his own success.

In the 21st stage, the initial winner Le Grèves together with the initial second-placed cyclist Louyet were punished by the jury, because of irregular sprinting. They were set back to the 6th and 7th place, and Jean Aerts, who initially was third, was named the winner of the race.

In the 22nd stage, the winner of the race was determined by one lap in the velodrome. This had not been planned, but was done because when the first group with 28 cyclists reached the velodrome, the gates were still closed.

Before the last stage, Martano was in second place, and Guerra in third. This last stage was won by Guerra, and thanks to the bonus time of two minutes, Guerra took over the second place.

Results

Stage winners

General classification
The time that each cyclist required to finish each stage was recorded, and these times were added together for the general classification. If a cyclist had received a time bonus, it was subtracted from this total; all time penalties were added to this total. The cyclist with the least accumulated time was the race leader, identified by the yellow jersey.
The bonus in the 1933 Tour de France were also decisive for the overall victory. Without the bonus of two minutes for the stage winner, Giuseppe Martano would have won the race. Speicher received six minutes for his three-stage victories and Guerra ten minutes for five victories, whereas Martano had received no bonus time.

Team classification
For the fourth time, there was an official team competition, this time won by the French team.
The team classification was calculated in 1933 by adding up the times of the best three cyclists of a team; the team with the least time was the winner.

All five teams finished with at least three cyclists, so all five teams were ranked in the final team classification.

Mountains classification
The mountains classification in the Tour de France was calculated for the first time in 1933. There were 16 mountains in de route of the 1933 Tour de France, and for the first cyclists to reach the top of the mountain, points were given. The first on the top got 10 points, the second 9 points, and so on, until the tenth cyclist who received 1 point. In 1933, it was sponsored by Martini & Rossi.

Aftermath
For the 1933 UCI Road World Championships, that was held after the race, Tour de France winner Georges Speicher was initially not selected. Only after a French cyclist that had been selected dropped out, Speicher was brought in as a replacement at the last notice, and won the race. Speicher was the first cyclist to win the Tour de France and the World Championship in the same year.

The national team format that had been introduced in 1930, had in four races produced four French victories. The French audience was therefore greatly interested in the race, and the organising newspaper l'Auto had a record circulation of 854000.

Notes

References

Bibliography

External links

 
1933 in road cycling
1933 in French sport
1933
June 1933 sports events
July 1933 sports events